Camille Gandilhon Gens d'Armes (1871–1948) was a French poet.

1871 births
1948 deaths
French poets
People from Cantal
French male poets